Creo Parametric, formerly known, together with Creo Elements/Pro, as Pro/Engineer and Wildfire, is a solid modeling or CAD, CAM, CAE, and associative 3D modeling application, running on Microsoft Windows. 

Creo Parametric should not to be confused with Creo Elements/Direct Modeling, which was CoCreate ME10 (2D) and or ME30 (3D) CAD Products. The ex-CoCreate CAD Products are now owned by PTC and offered as "Creo Elements/Direct Drafting" and Creo Elements/Direct Modling".

Creo Parametric is an application of a suite of 10 that provide collaborative solid modeling, assembly modeling, 2D orthographic views, finite element analysis, parametric modeling, sub-divisional and NURBS surface modeling, Drafting, and NC and tooling functionality for mechanical designers. 

Creo Elements/Pro compete directly with CATIA, SolidWorks, NX/Solid Edge, Inventor/Fusion 360, IRONCAD, and Onshape. It was created by Parametric Technology Corporation (PTC) and was the first of its kind to market. 

The software uses a specific file naming scheme, not allowing certain characters (including spaces).

Overview

Creo Elements (formerly Pro/Engineer), PTC's parametric, integrated 3D CAD/CAM/CAE solution, is used by manufacturers for mechanical engineering, design and manufacturing.

Pro/Engineer was the industry's first rule-based constraint (sometimes called "parametric" or "variational") 3D CAD modeling system. The parametric modeling approach uses parameters, dimensions, features, and relationships to capture intended model behavior. This design approach can be family-based or platform-driven, where the strategy is to use engineering constraints and relationships to quickly optimize the design, or where the resulting geometry may be complex or based upon equations.  Creo Elements provides a complete set of design, analysis and manufacturing capabilities on one, integral, scalable platform.  These required capabilities include Solid Modeling, Surfacing, Rendering, Data Interoperability, Routed Systems Design, Simulation, Tolerance Analysis, and NC and Tooling Design.

Creo Elements can be used to create a complete 3D digital model of manufactured goods. The models consist of 2D and 3D solid model data which can also be used downstream in finite element analysis, rapid prototyping, tooling design, and CNC manufacturing.  All data are associative and interchangeable between the CAD, CAE and CAM modules without conversion.  A product and its entire bill of materials (BOM) can be modeled accurately with fully associative engineering drawings, and revision control information.  The associativity functionality in Creo Elements enables users to make changes in the design at any time during the product development process and automatically update the end products.  This capability enables concurrent engineering – design, analysis and manufacturing engineers working in parallel – and streamlines product development processes.

Summary of capabilities

Creo Elements is a software application within the CAID/CAD/CAM/CAE category.

Creo Elements is a parametric, feature-based modeling architecture incorporated into a single database philosophy with rule-based design capabilities. It provides in-depth control of complex geometry. The capabilities of the product can be split into the three main headings of Engineering Design, Analysis and Manufacturing. This data is then documented in a standard 2D production drawing or the 3D drawing standard ASME Y14.41-2003.

Product Design 

Creo Elements offers a range of tools to enable the generation of a complete digital representation of the product being designed. In addition to the general geometry tools there is also the ability to generate geometry of other integrated design disciplines such as industrial and standard pipe work and complete wiring definitions. Tools are also available to support collaborative development.

A number of concept design tools that provide up-front Industrial Design concepts can then be used in the downstream process of engineering the product. These range from conceptual Industrial design sketches, reverse engineering with point cloud data and comprehensive free-form surface.

Analysis 

Creo Elements has numerous analysis tools available and covers thermal, static, dynamic and fatigue finite element analysis along with other tools all designed to help with the development of the product. These tools include human factors, manufacturing tolerance, mould flow and design optimization. The design optimization can be used at a geometry level to obtain the optimum design dimensions and in conjunction with the finite element analysis.

Surface Modeling 
Creo has a good surface modeling capabilities also. Using commands like Boundary blend and Sweep we can create surface models. Advance options like Style (Interactive Surface Design Extension - ISDX) and Freestyle  provide more capabilities to designer to create complicated models with ease.

Manufacturing

By using the fundamental abilities of the software with regards to the single data source principle, it provides a rich set of tools in the manufacturing environment in the form of tooling design and simulated CNC machining and output.

Tooling options cover specialty tools for molding, die-casting and progressive tooling design.

Release History
The UNIX version was discontinued after 4.0, except x86-64 UNIX on Solaris. The name changed to Creo 1.0 after Pro/Engineer Wildfire 5.0 (rebranded PTC Creo Elements/Pro), took place on October 28, 2010, which coincided with PTC’s announcement of Creo, a new design software application suite.

For the first 10 years, PTC generally released 2 versions per year, with some exceptions. The initial release (Rev 1) was in 1988.

See also
 Comparison of CAD editors for AEC
 Creo
 Creo Elements/View
 Parametric Technology Corporation
 Pro/DESKTOP

Comparable Software
 Inventor
 CATIA
 Cimatron
 Siemens NX
 Solid Edge
 SolidWorks
IRONCAD
Onshape
KeyCreator

References

External links 

 

Computer-aided design software
Computer-aided manufacturing software
Computer-aided engineering software
1987 software